The Mistress of Spices, (1997), set in contemporary Oakland, California, is a novel by Indian American writer and University of Houston Creative Writing Program professor Chitra Banerjee Divakaruni.

Plot
Tilo, the titular character, is a shopkeeper born in India and trained in magic, who helps customers satisfy their needs and desires with the mystical properties of spices. Her life changes when she falls for an American man named Raven, whom the book strongly implies is Native American. Unfortunately, she chooses to disregard the rules of her training in her pursuit of romance and her decision to seek out customers outside her shop, which results in the spices inflicting punishment on her and those she cares about. To save Raven from being another victim of the spices' powerful magic, she decides to leave him after one last night where they make love. Afterwards, she accepts the punishment for disregarding the rules of her training, which results in the store being destroyed in an earthquake. She survives, and she and Raven reconcile and decide to help rebuild the shop.

Film, TV or theatrical adaptations

The film The Mistress of Spices, based on the novel, was released in 2005.  It is directed by Paul Mayeda Berges, with a script by Berges and his wife, British filmmaker Gurinder Chadha.  The film stars Aishwarya Rai and Dylan McDermott.

External links
Official site
Book review on sawnet.org
Book review on penguinbooksindia.com
Chitra Divakaruni at Random House

1997 American novels
Novels set in Oakland, California
Novels by Chitra Banerjee Divakaruni
Doubleday (publisher) books
Indian diaspora in fiction
Novels set in the 1990s
American novels adapted into films